Zhuravne (Zhirovne) is an urban-type settlement in Stryi Raion, Lviv Oblast of western Ukraine. It hosts the administration of Zhuravne settlement hromada, one of the hromadas of Ukraine. Population: .

History
The town was first mentioned in 1435. In the 16th century, Zhuravne was granted city status. Prior to World War II the town was located in Poland.

Zhuravne gained recognition in Polish history because of the battle which took place nearby between the king of Poland, John III Sobieski, and the Turkish and Tatar invaders, a battle that ended in a peace treaty. The town was also the birthplace of the renowned Polish poet and author Mikołaj Rej in 1505.

The German forces occupied the territory in early July 1941. From the beginning of September to November 1942, the majority of Zhuravne's Jews were deported to the Belzec extermination camp. About 160 Jewish specialists were purposefully left and confined to an open ghetto. In February and June 1943, they were murdered during two mass executions on the outskirts of the village carried out by German Gendarmerie and Ukrainian local police.

Until 18 July 2020, Zhuravne belonged to Zhydachiv Raion. The raion was abolished in July 2020 as part of the administrative reform of Ukraine, which reduced the number of raions of Lviv Oblast to seven. The area of Zhydachiv Raion was merged into Stryi Raion.

References

Urban-type settlements in Stryi Raion